The Great Western Lacrosse League, also known as the GWLL, was an NCAA Division I men's college lacrosse athletic conference that existed from 1994 to 2009.  The conference was created when the NCAA instituted automatic qualifiers to the NCAA championship tournament; in so doing, it eliminated the "western region" bid.

The GWLL ceased operations in 2010, as a result of Notre Dame's 2008 decision to leave the conference for the newly established Big East lacrosse conference in 2010; the remaining GWLL schools, including the Air Force Academy, University of Denver, The Ohio State University, Quinnipiac University, and Bellarmine University, joined the ECAC, as a five-team GWLL would no longer have been eligible to receive an automatic bid to the NCAA championship tournament under the rule requiring conferences to have at least six members to qualify for the bid.

History

The GWLL was established in 1994.  The original members were Air Force, Butler, Denver, Michigan State, Notre Dame, and Ohio State.  Just prior to the 1997 season, Michigan State left the conference after the school dropped varsity lacrosse, leaving the league with five clubs. The NCAA requires a conference to have six members in order to be eligible for an automatic qualifier to the NCAA tournament.  As a result, Fairfield was added as a sixth member.  Fairfield later left the conference to join the ECAC and was replaced by Quinnipiac.  Later, Butler left the GWLL when its athletic department dropped several sports programs including men's lacrosse in January 2007.  Bellarmine was added to the conference in 2007 after the school began competing in Division I men's lacrosse in 2005.

In 2008, the GWLL held its first championship tournament.  Previously, the GWLL champion was determined by regular-season results.  Notre Dame won the championship with a 9-2 victory over Ohio State, earning an automatic bid to the 2008 NCAA Division I Men's Lacrosse Championship. In addition to Notre Dame's automatic bid, Ohio State and Denver also received "at-large" bids to the NCAA tournament, giving the GWLL three teams in the tournament.  The following year, in 2009, Notre Dame again won the GWLL championship, defeating Ohio State 16-7 in the conference's last tournament.

Former members

Champions

Regular Season Champions

Playoff Champions

Annual Awards

Player of the Year

Newcomer of the Year

Coach of the Year

References

External links
 Great Western Lacrosse League Website

Defunct NCAA Division I conferences
College lacrosse leagues in the United States
1994 establishments in the United States
2009 disestablishments in the United States
Sports leagues established in 1994
Sports leagues disestablished in 2009